The Government of the Republic of Korea (ROK or South Korea) does not meet the minimum standards for the elimination of trafficking. The government continues to make improvements but South Korea has been lowered to Tier 2. The government demonstrated serious and sustained efforts by identifying and providing services to a comparable number of victims relative to the previous reporting period, increasing inspections of entertainment businesses, and increasing efforts to reduce the demand for commercial sex acts. Although the government meets the minimum standards, it did not adequately address labor trafficking; the government investigated and prosecuted fewer cases, and penalized and deported trafficking victims due to inadequate identification efforts.

U.S. State Department's Office to Monitor and Combat Trafficking in Persons placed the country in "Tier 1"  in 2018.

Sex trafficking

Despite (or because of) the illegality of prostitution in the country, sex trafficking is prevalent. Sex trafficking victims in South Korea are often sold in kissing rooms, massage parlours, and karaoke bars. The majority of women enter sex work through job advertisements in newspaper, magazines, or the internet. Advertisements look like legitimate jobs, but women are required to engage in sex service once they are hired. Some women voluntarily enter for survival. Regardless of how they enter sex work, brothels abuse them economically, physically, and mentally. Procurers use debt bondage and lure women in with advance payments. They write employment contracts so that it is virtually impossible to pay back the debt. Contracts involve heavy penalties for failing to generate daily profits for owners. They eventually become stuck in increasing debt, and cannot get away from procurers.

Prosecution
The government maintained law enforcement efforts. In 2004 prostitution was criminalized. In 2002, prostitution turnover was still 24 trillion won ($22 billion), but the ban in 2010 reduced this to 6.9 trillion won ($6.2 billion). Furthermore, Chapter 31 of the criminal code criminalized sex and labor trafficking and prescribed penalties of up to 15 years imprisonment for trafficking crimes, which were sufficiently stringent and, with respect to sex trafficking, commensurate with penalties prescribed for other serious crimes, such as rape. In 2017, the government reported investigating 448 reported trafficking cases (562 in 2016), indicting 327 suspects (426 in 2016), and convicting 127 offenders (127 in 2016). Police investigated three cases of forced labor involving disabled victims. The government did not initiate any prosecutions under the trafficking statute in 2017. Of those convicted, 42 received suspended sentences and three were sentenced to a fine. Law enforcement entities did not have dedicated anti-trafficking teams. The government cooperated with foreign governments in the investigation and prosecution of sex trafficking cases. The government held numerous trainings throughout the year for prosecutors and law enforcement officers on sex trafficking issues and victim protection; however, government trainings did not address labor trafficking. Officials’ understanding of human trafficking continued to be limited and inconsistent; there remained widespread, false perceptions that kidnapping, buying and selling, physical force, or confinement were required to qualify a case as trafficking. As a result, law enforcement and prosecutors pursued most trafficking offenses under provisions of the law with the less severe penalties. A police officer who engaged in commercial sex acts with a child was convicted under the act on the protection of child and juveniles against sexual abuse and sentenced to a fine of 15 million Korean Won ($14,070) and 40 hours of “john school.”

Protection
The government maintained efforts to protect trafficking victims. The government identified and assisted 77 foreign sex trafficking victims, compared with 82 in 2016; comprehensive statistics for Korean or labor trafficking victims was unavailable; however the government reported identifying three labor trafficking victims and assisting 7,392 victims of sex trafficking or related crimes in 2017. The government continued to use and distribute guidelines established in 2013 to identify victims of sex trafficking but did not have guidelines to identify victims of labor trafficking. In 2013, the government made legislative changes in the fight against human trafficking. The amendments provide that not only sex trafficking but also trafficking in labour will be punishable to up to 15 years' imprisonment (in line with the international standards set out in the United Nations Protocol to Prevent, Suppress and Punish Trafficking in Persons (2000)).

In 2016, the National Human Rights Commission distributed updated identification guidelines to government, but no agency had implemented these guidelines by the end of the reporting period. The Korean National Police Agency was responsible for guiding crime victims, including trafficking victims, from the initial point of contact with law enforcement to protection and support systems; however, the government did not issue or use formal guidelines for referring victims to services. The government did not report efforts to identify potential victims of trafficking aboard South Korean flagged fishing vessels. The Ministry of Gender Equality and Family (MOGEF) supported 96 facilities that provided services to female sex trafficking victims, in addition to victims of other types of crime. These facilities assisted trafficking victims through counseling services, shelter, education, and rehabilitation support. The government made some services offered through these facilities available to male victims, such as counseling, medical, and legal assistance. In addition, the government operated 31 counseling centers and shelters that trafficking victims with disabilities were able to access. Nonetheless, NGOs reported the quality of government services were not adequate for male, disabled, foreign, or juvenile victims. NGOs reported government officials lacked awareness of trafficking issues and did not utilize a victim-centered approach. As a result of ineffective identification procedures, authorities arrested, detained, and deported sex trafficking victims. Police and other government officials often treated female South Korean and foreign sex trafficking victims as criminals, rather than identifying them as trafficking victims. The government offered foreign victims legal alternatives to their removal to countries in which they may face hardship or retribution. As an incentive to encourage foreign trafficking victims to participate in investigations and prosecutions, the government issued G-1 visas with permission to work for up to one year. However, NGOs reported authorities often did not make victims aware of their eligibility for G-1 visas and sometimes deported victims without referring to services. Victims could file a civil suit to receive restitution, and some victims received compensation during the reporting period.

Prevention
The government increased efforts to prevent trafficking. Both the 3P Anti-Trafficking Policy Index and the Animal Ranking ranked South Korea as one of the leading countries fighting against human trafficking. To raise awareness, the government conducted public service announcements, advertising campaigns, and events; distributed materials online; and publicized its anti-trafficking hotline. The Inspection Team for Implementation of the National Action Plan for the Promotion and Protection of Human Rights was responsible for coordinated governmental efforts to address sex trafficking but did not meet during the reporting period; there was no similar coordinating body for labor trafficking. In an effort to prevent exploitation among E6-2 entertainment visa holders, the government began to require visa holders to receive training on their rights and labor laws. In addition, MOGEF conducted inspections of 256 restaurants, bars, and illegal brothels (101 in 2016), and police arrested 323 building owners associated with illegal entertainment businesses. The Ministry of Employment and Labor (MOEL) inspected 20,000 workplaces for labor exploitation, in addition to 200 workplaces with high numbers of employees with disabilities and 3,069 businesses with foreign workers. The government found 7,053 violations in 1,510 workplaces with foreign workers (3,337 violations in 2016); MOEL instructed businesses to address violations, but it was unclear whether charges were brought against violators. MOEL provided interpretation and counseling services to migrant workers through 42 support centers that were partially funded by the government. The government did not operate a hotline specifically for reporting potential trafficking crimes, but MOGEF continued to operate hotlines in 13 languages that were accessible to trafficking victims, and the Ministry of Oceans and Fisheries continued to operate a hotline for foreign crewmembers on South Korean fishing vessels. The government lacked a trafficking-specific national plan of action; its 2012 human rights national action plan included some anti-trafficking efforts. The government did not make efforts to reduce the demand for forced labor. To reduce the demand for commercial sex acts, in 2017 the government began to require chatting websites and mobile applications to display a notice about sex trafficking and prostitution laws; provided schools, government agencies, local governments, and state-run corporations with anti-prostitution and trafficking education programs; and publicized the illegality of child sex tourism in airports, train stations, and travel agencies. South Korean men remained a source of demand for child sex tourism in Southeast Asia and the Pacific Islands. The government denied passport issuance to 11 South Koreans (four in 2016) for engagement in sex tourism abroad; the Gangwon Provincial Police arrested an individual suspected of operating a blog providing information to potential sex tourists. The government continued to provide anti-trafficking training to troops prior to and after their deployment abroad on international peacekeeping missions.

Several online scandals have taken place in South Korea in recent years. In 2018 tens of thousands of women protested against illegal filming in motels and public toilets. In 2019, online group chats which distributed videos of women engaged in sexual acts without their consent, were discovered by the South Korean police. As a result, the "ReSET project" was founded to counteract these group chats. In 2020, a Ring of chat groups was investigated which ran via an encrypted telegram messaging app and in which girls were filmed during forced sexual humiliation. As a result, about 120 people were arrested and four million people signed two petitions demanding harsher punishments for running such chat rooms. In 2019, efforts to eliminate human trafficking were classified as Tier1, as they fully comply with the minimum standard. However, it is criticized that no formal guidelines for the identification of victims of trafficking in human beings have been established and no training for law enforcement agencies has been provided.

See also 

 Slavery on salt farms in Sinan County

References

 
South Korea
South Korea
Human rights abuses in South Korea
Violence against women in South Korea